The 8th FINA World Championships or the 1998 World Aquatics Championships were held from 8 to 17 January 1998 in Perth, Western Australia. The championships features competition in all five of FINA's disciplines: Swimming, Diving, Water Polo, Synchronised swimming and Open Water Swimming. The main venue for competition was Challenge Stadium, which hosted all disciplines save Open Water.

Michael Klim was named as the leading male swimmer of the meet, winning the 200 m freestyle, 100 m butterfly, 4×200 m freestyle, 4×100 m medley relay, as well as silver in the 100 m freestyle, 4×100 m freestyle relay and bronze in the 50 m freestyle. Ian Thorpe became the youngest ever male to become world champion when he won the 400 m freestyle event aged 15 years and three months.

Doping
During a routine customs check on Chinese swimmer Yuan Yuan's luggage, enough human growth hormone was discovered to supply the entire women's swimming team for the duration of the championships. Only Yuan was sanctioned for the incident, with speculation that this was connected to the nomination of Juan Antonio Samaranch by China for the Nobel Peace Prize in 1993. Tests in Perth also found the presence of the banned diuretic masking agent triamterine in the urine of four swimmers, Wang Luna, Yi Zhang, Huijue Cai and Wei Wang. The swimmers were suspended from competition for two years, with three coaches associated with the swimmers, Zhi Cheng, Hiuqin Xu and Zhi Cheng each suspended for three months.

Medal table

Results

Diving

Men

Women

Open water swimming

Men

Women

Mixed

Swimming

Synchronised swimming

Water polo
Men

Women

References

External links
 Swim Rankings results

 
Aquatics Championship
Aquatics Championship
FINA World Aquatics Championships
W
World Aquatics Championships
1990s in Perth, Western Australia